Mijancas is a town in the municipality of Berantevilla in the region of Cuadrilla de Añana in the province of Álava in Spain. It is located at an altitude of 524 meters  and has a population of 41 inhabitants.

References 

Municipalities of Spain